Sidi Abu Al-Hajjaj Luxo in  Abu Al-Hajjaj Luxor

(in Arabic سيدي أبو الحجاج الأقصري ،أبو الحجاج الاقصري)،(Born in Baghdad at the beginning of the sixth century AH and died in the country of Luxor in the year 642 AH), an Egyptian Sufi, and during the era of the Ayyubid state in 658 AH (1286 AD) he founded a mosque and was named after the Abu Al-Hajjaj Al-Aqsari Mosque.

Gallery

See also
 Abu Haggag Mosque
 Islam in Egypt
 Lists of mosques
 List of mosques in Africa
 List of mosques in Egypt

References

External links

Eternal Egypt: Mosque of Abu Haggag 

Mosques in Egypt
Ayyubid architecture in Egypt
Buildings and structures in Luxor Governorate
Luxor
Establishments in the Rashidun Caliphate
642 deaths